Steerprop Oy is a Finnish company that produces azimuth thrusters for marine propulsion. The company was established in 2000 in Rauma by a group of people who had previously worked at Rolls-Royce Marine Division.

Steerprop's main products are Z-drive and L-drive azimuth thrusters used for main propulsion of tugboats, icebreakers, offshore vessels and passenger ships. In addition to pushing and pulling type thrusters, the company also offers a line of contra-rotating (CRP) propulsion units with two propellers rotating in opposite directions.

See also 
 Finnish maritime cluster

References 

Manufacturing companies of Finland